Stan Black (November 12, 1955 – August 24, 2018) was an American football defensive back. He played for the San Francisco 49ers in 1977.

Stan was a member of the 1976 Playboy All-America team.

He died after being hit by a car on August 24, 2018, in Madison, Mississippi at age 62.

References

1955 births
2018 deaths
American football defensive backs
Mississippi State Bulldogs football players
San Francisco 49ers players
People from Greenville, Mississippi
Road incident deaths in Mississippi
Pedestrian road incident deaths